Stowfield quarry is a quarry in the Forest of Dean about 2 km south of Staunton, near Coleford, Gloucestershire, England.

References

Quarries in Gloucestershire